In game theory, "guess  of the average" is a game that explores how a player’s strategic reasoning process takes into account the mental process of others in the game.

In this game, players simultaneously select a real number between 0 and 100, inclusive.

History 

Alain Ledoux is the founding father of the guess  of the average-game. In 1981, Ledoux used this game as a tie breaker in his French magazine Jeux et Stratégie. He asked about 4,000 readers, who reached the same number of points in previous puzzles, to state an integer between 1 and 1,000,000,000. Rosemarie Nagel (1995) revealed the potential of guessing games of that kind: They are able to disclose participants' "depth of reasoning."

In his influential book, Keynes compared the determination of prices in a stock market to that of a beauty contest. The competitors had to pick out the 6 prettiest faces from 100 photos, and the winner is the competitor whose choices best matches the average preferences of all the competitors. Keynes observed that "It is not a case of choosing those that, to the best of one’s judgment, are really the prettiest, nor even those that average opinion genuinely thinks the prettiest. We have reached the third degree where we devote our intelligences to anticipating what average opinion expects the average opinion to be. And there are some, I believe, who practice the fourth, fifth and higher degrees."

Due to the analogy to Keynes's comparison of newspaper beauty contests and stock market investments the guessing game is also known as the Keynesian beauty contest. Rosemarie Nagel's experimental beauty contest became a famous game in experimental economics. The forgotten inventor of this game was unearthed in 2009 during an online beauty contest experiment with chess players provided by the University of Kassel: Alain Ledoux, together with over 6,000 other chess players, participated in that experiment which looked familiar to him.

Equilibrium analysis 
In this game, there is no strictly dominant strategy, but there are strongly dominated strategies. There is a unique pure strategy Nash equilibrium. This equilibrium can be found by iterated elimination of weakly dominated strategies.

Intuitively, guessing any number higher than 2/3 of what you expect others to guess on average cannot be part of a Nash equilibrium. The highest possible average that would occur if everyone guessed 100 is 66+2/3. Therefore, choosing a number that lies above  is strictly dominated for every player. These guesses can thus be eliminated. Once these strategies are eliminated for every player, 66+2/3 becomes the new highest possible average (that is, if everyone chooses 66+2/3). This process will continue as this logic is continually applied. With each step, the highest possible logical answer keeps getting smaller, until all numbers above 0 have been eliminated. If all players understand this logic and select 0, the game reaches its Nash equilibrium, which also happens to be the Pareto optimal solution. At this state, every player has chosen to play the best response strategy for themselves, given what everyone else is choosing.

However, this degeneration does not occur in quite the same way if choices are restricted to, for example, the integers between 0 and 100. In this case, all integers except 0 and 1 vanish; it becomes advantageous to select 0 if you expect that at least  of all players will do so, and select 1 otherwise. (In this way, it is a lopsided version of the so-called "consensus game", where one wins by being in the majority.)

Rationality versus common knowledge of rationality 
This game illustrates the difference between perfect rationality of an actor and the common knowledge of rationality of all players. To achieve its Nash equilibrium of 0, this game requires all players to be perfectly rational, rationality to be common knowledge, and all players to expect everyone else to behave accordingly. Common knowledge means that every player has the same information, and they also know that everyone else knows that, and that everyone else knows that everyone else knows that, and so on, infinitely. Common knowledge of rationality of all players is the reason why the winning guess is 0.

Economic game theorists have modelled this relationship between rationality and the common knowledge of rationality through K-level reasoning. K stands for the number of times a cycle of reasoning is repeated. A person playing at k-level 0 would approach the game naively, without considering what the other players would do. These players would never play a dominated strategy, so they would pick a number less than 67 because 2/3 of 100 is 67. A player playing at k-level 1 would assume that everyone else was playing at k-level 0, resulting in an average of 67, and thus their guess would be 45 (2/3 of 67). At k-level 2, a player would play more sophisticatedly and assume that all other players are playing at k-level 1, so they would choose 30 (2/3 of 45). It would take approximately 21 k-levels to reach 0, the Nash equilibrium of the game.

Evidence suggest that most people play at k-levels 0 to 3, so you would just have to think one step ahead of that to have a higher chance at winning the game. Therefore, being aware of this logic allow players to adjust their strategy. This means that perfectly rational players playing in such a game should not guess 0 unless they know that the other players are rational as well, and that all players' rationality is common knowledge. If a rational player reasonably believes that other players will not follow the chain of elimination described above, it would be rational for him/her to guess a number above 0 as their best response.

In reality, we can assume that most players are not perfectly rational, and do not have common knowledge of each other's rationality. As a result, they will also expect others to have a bounded rationality and thus guess a number higher than 0.

Experimental results 
This game is a common demonstration in game theory classes. It reveals the significant heterogeneity of behaviour. It is unlikely that many people will play according to the Nash Equilibrium. This is because the game has no strictly dominant strategy, so it requires players to consider what others will do. For Nash Equilibrium to be played, players would need to assume both that everyone else is rational and that there is common knowledge of rationality. However, this is a strong assumption.

Experiments demonstrate that many people make mistakes and do not assume common knowledge of rationality. It has been demonstrated that even economics graduate students do not guess 0. When performed among ordinary people it is usually found that the winner's guess is much higher than 0:  the winning value was found to be 21.6 in a large online competition organized by the Danish newspaper Politiken. 19,196 people participated and the prize was 5000 Danish kroner.

Grosskopf and Nagel’s investigation also revealed that most players do not choose 0 the first time they play this game. Instead, they realise that 0 is the Nash Equilibrium after some repetitions. A study by Nagel reported an average initial choice of around 36. This corresponds to approximately two levels of k-level reasoning. 

Kocher and Sutter compared the behaviours between individual and groups in playing this type of game. They observed that while both subjects applied roughly the same level of reasoning, groups learned faster. This demonstrated that repetition enabled a group of individuals to observe others’ behaviour in previous games and correspondingly choose a number that increases their chances of winning the game.

Sbriglia’s investigation also revealed that non-winners often try to imitate winners’ understanding of the game’s structure. Accordingly, other players adopt strategies which are best responses to the imitators’ behaviour instead of to the average level of rationality. This accelerates the attainment of the game’s Nash equilibrium.

Real-life examples of K-level reasoning 
K-level reasoning can be useful in several social and competitive interactions. For example, deciding when to sell or buy stock in the stock market before too many others do it and decrease your profitability. Philosophers and psychologists observe this as an ability to consider other’s mental states to predict their actions.

Another example of K-level reasoning is when stock traders evaluate stocks based on the value that others place on those stocks. Their goal is to foresee changes in valuation ahead of the general public. Their choice is also likely influenced by other individuals’ choices, especially if those choices have been successful previously. This demonstrates the importance of social learning in arriving at the equilibrium of any decision-making.

Similarly, during penalty kicks in soccer, both the shooter and goalie simultaneously decide whether to go left or right depending on what they expect the other person to do. Goalies tend to memorise the behavioural patterns of their opponents, but penalty shooters know that and will act accordingly. In each example, individuals will weigh their own understanding of the best response against how well they think others understand the situation (i.e., how rational they are).

See also 
 Keynesian beauty contest
 Unique bid auction
 Unexpected hanging paradox

Notes

External links 
 Short video explanation of the game by TED-Ed

Non-cooperative games